Cycling at the 2015 Southeast Asian Games was held in Marina Barrage Route, Singapore from 11 to 14 June 2015.

Participating nations
A total of 66 athletes from 10 nations will be competing in cycling at the 2015 Southeast Asian Games:

Competition schedule
The following is the competition schedule for the cycling competitions:

Medalists

Men

Women

Medal table

References

External links
 

2015
Southeast Asian Games
2015 Southeast Asian Games events